Lineboro (also Linesboro) is an unincorporated community located in northeastern Carroll County, Maryland, United States. The community was named for its founder, Jonathan Line. Coincidentally, its name refers to its location near the Mason–Dixon line.

History
Much of the town was added to the National Register of Historic Places as the Lineboro Historic District in 1996.

Lineboro was founded circa 1721 by Jonathan Line. The railroad eventually came to Lineboro and stopped at the Line farm. Today, the Line house is still standing where Warner and Sons feed processing plant is located.

References

Unincorporated communities in Carroll County, Maryland
Unincorporated communities in Maryland